The Hollywood Blues Tour was a concert tour through the United States and Canada, undertaken by American rock band ZZ Top. Named after a warm-up show at the House of Blues in West Hollywood, California, the tour was their second of which to be staged without a supporting album. As a result, they did not perform any newer material. Although this was a criticism for the tour, it was generally well-received—a critic from The Florida Times-Union regarded the band as "one of rock's most reliable acts; you just know they're going to put on a good show". In contrast to ZZ Top's elaborately-staged productions from previous tours, the Hollywood Blues Tour utilized an austere stage setup. To embrace the group's renowned concept of visual imagery, the stage featured an LED drape for a backdrop video screen that showed visual effects, video clips and flashing text phrases, along with amplifiers stacks and a Van de Graaff generator.

Consisting of three legs and 87 shows, the tour began in Boca Raton, Florida on March 12, 2007 and ended in Miami, Oklahoma on October 27, 2007. After the first leg, the tour was expanded for a summer tour with the Stray Cats and The Pretenders, which was branded as "Summer Scorcher". With a total gross of $17.8 million, Hollywood Blues sold over 380,000 tickets at its conclusion. The band's 2008 live album and DVD Live from Texas was filmed and recorded during a show in Grand Prairie, Texas after the tour's conclusion. A portion of the tour is shown in the Eagle Rock 2009 concert film Double Down Live.

Tour dates

Notes

References

External links
Peter Zurich's ZZ Top Gallery

ZZ Top concert tours
2007 concert tours